The  is a literature museum in Kitakyushu, Japan. It is dedicated to Seichō Matsumoto, who spent the first half of his life in Kitakyusyu. The museum is located next to Kokura Castle.

Features of the Museum 
The museum displays exhibits and graphic panels to introduce a collection of Seichō Matsumoto's works and the related items (manuscript, letter, artwork, his favorite goods, etc.). The author's study room, library, and reception room, called "The Castle of Thought and Creation", are exhibited in the museum. They were relocated from his residence in Suginami-ward, Tokyo in which he spent the latter half of his life. In addition to these permanent exhibitions, special exhibitions regarding the author are often held.

The museum also has a role of research center related to Seichō Matsumoto, and publishes the research journal annually. It awarded Kikuchi Kan Prize in 2008 for the research activities.

Museum data 
 Construction: Two-storey building in reinforced concrete and precast concrete
 Building area: 1,583.50m²
 Total floor area: 3,391.69 m2
 Building plan: Tadanaga Miyamoto() Architect and Associates
 Address: Jōnai 2-3-3, Kokurakita-ku, Kitakyushu, Fukuoka Prefecture 803-0813

See also

 Kokura Castle

References

External links

 Matsumoto Seicho Memorial Museum 

Literary museums in Japan
Biographical museums in Japan
Museums in Fukuoka Prefecture
Museums established in 1998
Buildings and structures in Kitakyushu
1998 establishments in Japan